Conus distans, common name the distant cone, is a species of sea snail, a marine gastropod mollusk in the family Conidae, the cone snails and their allies.

Like all species within the genus Conus, these snails are predatory and venomous. They are capable of "stinging" humans, therefore live ones should be handled carefully or not at all.

Description
The length of the shell varies between 30 mm and 137 mm.
The yellowish fawn-colored shell is obsoletely banded with white at the middle and upper part, sometimes the bands are not continuous, but consist of irregular oblique markings. The body whorl is encircled by obsolete impressed lines. It is stained with violet-chestnut towards the base. The low spire is convex, with rather obtuse rounded tubercles. The white interior is stained with light violet.

Distribution
This marine species occurs in the Red Sea, in the tropical Indo-West Pacific and off Papua New Guinea and Australia (the Northern Territory, Queensland and Western Australia).

References

 Bruguière, M. 1792. Encyclopédie Méthodique ou par ordre de matières. Histoire naturelle des vers. Paris : Panckoucke Vol. 1 i-xviii, 757 pp.
 Reeve, L.A. 1843. Monograph of the genus Conus. pls 1–39 in Reeve, L.A. (ed.). Conchologica Iconica. London : L. Reeve & Co. Vol. 1.
 Brazier, J. 1896. A new genus and three new species of Mollusca from New South Wales, New Hebrides and Western Australia. Proceedings of the Linnean Society of New South Wales 21: 345–347
 Demond, J. 1957. Micronesian reef associated gastropods. Pacific Science 11(3): 275–341, fig. 2, pl. 1
 Rippingale, O.H. & McMichael, D.F. 1961. Queensland and Great Barrier Reef Shells. Brisbane : Jacaranda Press 210 pp.
 Shikama, T. 1970. Description of a new species of Conus from Shiono-Misaki, Wakayama Prefecture. Venus 29(2): 115–116
 Wilson, B.R. & Gillett, K. 1971. Australian Shells: illustrating and describing 600 species of marine gastropods found in Australian waters. Sydney : Reed Books 168 pp. 
 Hinton, A. 1972. Shells of New Guinea and the Central Indo-Pacific. Milton : Jacaranda Press xviii 94 pp.
 Salvat, B. & Rives, C. 1975. Coquillages de Polynésie. Tahiti : Papéete Les editions du pacifique, pp. 1–391.
 Cernohorsky, W.O. 1978. Tropical Pacific Marine Shells. Sydney : Pacific Publications 352 pp., 68 pls. 
 Kay, E.A. 1979. Hawaiian Marine Shells. Reef and shore fauna of Hawaii. Section 4 : Mollusca. Honolulu, Hawaii : Bishop Museum Press Bernice P. Bishop Museum Special Publication Vol. 64(4) 653 pp.
 Drivas, J.; Jay, M. (1987). Coquillages de La Réunion et de l'Île Maurice. Collection Les Beautés de la Nature. Delachaux et Niestlé: Neuchâtel. . 159 pp.
 Wilson, B. 1994. Australian Marine Shells. Prosobranch Gastropods. Kallaroo, WA : Odyssey Publishing Vol. 2 370 pp.
 Röckel, D., Korn, W. & Kohn, A.J. 1995. Manual of the Living Conidae. Volume 1: Indo-Pacific Region. Wiesbaden : Hemmen 517 pp.
 Puillandre N., Duda T.F., Meyer C., Olivera B.M. & Bouchet P. (2015). One, four or 100 genera? A new classification of the cone snails. Journal of Molluscan Studies. 81: 1–23

External links
 The Conus Biodiversity website
 Cone Shells – Knights of the Sea
 

\

distans
Gastropods described in 1792